The Source Presents: Hip Hop Hits, Volume 8 is the eighth annual music compilation album to be contributed by The Source magazine.  Released June 29, 2004, and distributed by Image Entertainment, Hip Hop Hits Volume 8 features sixteen hip hop and rap hits (one of them being the bonus track).  It went to number 43 on the Top R&B/Hip Hop Albums chart and number 45 on the Billboard 200 album chart.  It is also one of only two Hip Hop Hits albums to be released in the same year; Volume 9 was released six months later.

Three songs peaked number one on the Hot Rap Tracks chart:  Damn!, Right Thurr and Tipsy.  Volume 8 is the fifth album in the Hip Hop Hits series that does not feature a number one on the R&B chart; it is the sixth not to feature a number-one hit on the pop charts.

Track listing
Damn! - YoungBloodZ 
Industry - Wyclef Jean 
Right Thurr - Chingy 
Can't Stop, Won't Stop - Young Gunz 
Gangsta Nation - Nate Dogg and Westside Connection 
Clap Back - Ja Rule 
Through the Wire - Kanye West 
Skills - Gang Starr 
Tipsy - J-Kwon 
Quarterbackin' - Clipse and E-40 
Into You - Fabolous and Tamia 
Be Easy - T.I. 
Hotel - R. Kelly and Cassidy
Salt Shaker - Ying Yang Twins featuring Lil Jon & The East Side Boyz 
Recognize - Scarface 
Relationships (With Me and My Gun) - Benzino and Untouchables

References

Hip hop compilation albums
2004 compilation albums
Image Entertainment compilation albums